Acanthophippium sinense is a species of plant in the family Orchidaceae. It is found in China and Hong Kong.

References

External links 
 
 

sinense
Flora of Hong Kong
Endemic orchids of China
Endangered plants
Taxonomy articles created by Polbot
Plants described in 1838